Alan Buckett, sometimes referred to as John Buckett, was an English football manager.

Career
On 25 March 1938, Buckett managed Greece for a single 1938 FIFA World Cup qualification game against Hungary. Greece lost 11–1 in Budapest, a record defeat for the country that still stands to this day. Three days later, Buckett was in charge for an unofficial friendly against a mixed team from Kispest and Szeged in Hungary, resulting in a 2–1 win for Greece.

In December 1945, Buckett was appointed manager of Greek club Panionios. In 1947, Buckett left Panionios to return to England, being replaced as manager by Georgios Roussopoulos.

References

Date of birth missing
Year of birth missing
Date of death missing
Year of death missing
English football managers
Greece national football team managers
Panionios F.C. managers
Expatriate football managers in Greece
English expatriate sportspeople in Greece